Lizzie Emeh (1976/1977 – 5 November 2021) was a British artist, and disabilities rights activist. She performed at the 2012 Summer Paralympics opening ceremony.

In 1999, she joined the arts charity, Heart n Soul.

From  2018 to 2020, she partnered with Wellcome Collection, on Heart n Soul at the Hub.

Discography 

 Loud and Proud. 2009 
 See Me Part 1 - The Clan , 2015

Works

References

External links 

 http://www.lizzieemeh.com/
 https://heartnsoulatthehub.com/

1970s births
2021 deaths
British artists
British disability rights activists